Harrelson is a surname. Notable people with the surname include:

Real people
Bill Harrelson (born 1945), baseball player for one season for California Angels
Bud Harrelson (born 1944), baseball player and coach for New York Mets (and others)
Charles Harrelson (1938–2007), American contract killer; father of Woody Harrelson (below)
John W. Harrelson (1885–1955), chancellor of North Carolina State University
Ken Harrelson (born 1941), baseball player and TV announcer
Mary Jayne Harrelson (born 1978), athlete, 1500-metre runner
William H. Harrelson, American football coach at Nevada State University in 1897
Woody Harrelson (born 1961), American actor in Cheers and many notable films

Fictional characters
Edward Harrelson, of Japanese science fiction series Mobile Suit Gundam SEED

See also
Harrelson Boulevard, highway in Myrtle Beach, South Carolina
Harrelson Hall, building on North Carolina State University Main Campus
Josh Harrellson (born 1989), American basketball player
Haralson (surname)

English-language surnames